Hydrophorus oceanus  is a species of fly in the family of Dolichopodidae.
It is found in the Palearctic. For identification see

References

Insects described in 1838
oceanus
Palearctic insects
Taxa named by Pierre-Justin-Marie Macquart